Bogué is a department of Brakna Region in Mauritania.

List of municipalities in the department 
The Bogué department is made up of following communes:

 Boghé
 Dar El Aviya
 Dar El Barka
 Ould Biram.

In 2000, the entire population of the Bogué Department has a total of 63 123 inhabitants  (30 465 men and32 658 women).

References 

Departments of Mauritania